Nick Allder is an English special effects supervisor and coordinator. He started his career as an assistant camera operator and moved, after eight years, into special effects. He has won multiple awards, including an Academy Award for Best Visual Effects for the science-fiction horror film Alien (1979), and a BAFTA Award for Best Special Visual Effects for the science-fiction film The Fifth Element (1997). Allder has worked on the set of high-grossing films such as the epic space opera The Empire Strikes Back (1980) and the historical drama film Braveheart (1995).

Career
Allder started his professional career as an assistant camera operator, making advertisements. After eight years, he moved on to special effects.

Awards
In addition to winning an Academy Award for Alien and a BAFTA Award for The Fifth Element, Allder was nominated for an additional Saturn Award for Best Special Effects for Alien and a BAFTA Award for Best Special Visual Effects for the fantasy film Legend (1985)

Filmography

References

External links

 

1943 births
Best Visual Effects Academy Award winners
Best Visual Effects BAFTA Award winners
British filmmakers
Living people
Miniature model-makers
People from Buckinghamshire
Special effects people